Jacques Lebret (died 1645) was a Roman Catholic prelate who served as Bishop of Toul (1645).

Biography
Jacques Lebret was born in Paris, France.
On 24 April 1645, Jacques Lebret was appointed during the papacy of Pope Innocent X as Bishop of Toul.
On 7 May 1645, he was consecrated bishop by Celso Zani, Bishop Emeritus of Città della Pieve, with Ranuccio Scotti Douglas, Bishop of Borgo San Donnino, and Marco Antonio Coccini, Bishop of Anglona-Tursi, serving as co-consecrators. 
He served as Bishop of Toul until his death on 15 June 1645.

References 

17th-century French Roman Catholic bishops
Bishops appointed by Pope Innocent X
1645 deaths